is a fictional character in Nintendo's Star Fox video game series. He was created by Shigeru Miyamoto and Takaya Imamura. Wolf O'Donnell is an anthropomorphic wolf who is the leader of the Star Wolf mercenary team and rival to Fox McCloud. He first appeared in Star Fox 64 (1997), in which his team, Star Wolf, was hired by Andross to take down the Star Fox team; although unsuccessful in doing so, the dogfights between the two teams results in Wolf developing both grudging respect for Fox and a desire to defeat him in a rematch.

Wolf has featured as a supporting antagonist in several Star Fox games, as well as appearing in other game franchises including Starlink: Battle for Atlas and the Super Smash Bros. series. He has received mostly positive reception from critics, specifically regarding his addition to Super Smash Bros.

Character development
Wolf was originally planned to debut in Star Fox 2 for the Super Nintendo Entertainment System. Although Star Fox 2 was completely finished in 1995, it was canceled in 1996 due to various factors, such as the Nintendo 64's impending launch. Some of Star Fox 2s features (including Star Wolf) were carried over to subsequent Star Fox titles, including Star Fox 64, the release of which would serve as Wolf's debut in 1997. Star Fox 2 itself would later be included as part of the Super NES Classic Edition, which was released in 2017.

In the Super Smash Bros. series, Wolf's inclusion in Super Smash Bros. Brawl in 2008 was highly requested by fans due to his popularity, according to series creator Masahiro Sakurai. Although Krystal, another highly requested Star Fox character, was considered as a candidate by Sakurai, the combination of time constraints and using Fox and Falco as source materials resulted in Wolf having much better potential to be a fully realized fighter.

Appearances

In the Star Fox series
In Star Fox 2, Star Wolf is introduced as a mercenary group consisting of its leader Wolf and his wingmates Leon Powalski, Pigma Dengar and Algy. Due to the team's tenacious and unscrupulous methods, they have become feared throughout the Lylat System, the setting of the Star Fox games, with Wolf in particular being noted as someone who is willing to betray anyone for the right price. In order to ensure that his second attempt at conquering the Lylat System would succeed, Andross hired Star Wolf to eliminate Star Fox.

Wolf made his first canonical appearance in Star Fox 64 (1997). Like in Star Fox 2, he is the leader of Star Wolf, and his team is hired by Andross to kill Star Fox. Unlike in Star Fox 2, Wolf sports an eyepatch on his left eye instead of a large scar on his right eye, while Algy is replaced by Andrew Oikonny, Andross' nephew. Throughout the game, the player can battle Star Wolf up to two times, though there are three possible battles with them overall, depending on which routes are taken on the map. In the game's story, Wolf and company harass the Star Fox team, with Fox being pursued by Wolf specifically. If the player encounters Star Wolf by going through Venom's second route, Wolf's team members boast of their upgraded Wolfen ships. Compared to the rest of his team, Wolf himself appears with only an additional facial bandage, whereas his team member sport cybernetic implants. Shortly after Andross' defeat on Venom, Star Wolf abandons Andrew's Army and resumes being mercenaries willing to take on any mission regardless of legality.

Nine years after the events of Star Fox 64, Wolf reappeared in Star Fox: Assault (2005). During these intervening years, Wolf assumed control over the Sargasso Space Zone, an illegal hub for criminals and former members of the Venomian Army, and recruited Panther Caroso to replace Andrew and Pigma. When Star Fox arrived at the hub in search of Pigma, Star Wolf proceeded to face Star Fox in a dogfight over what Wolf presumed to be an invasion of his territory. Star Wolf would later come to the aid of Star Fox in subsequent battles against the Aparoids, the game's antagonists, but disappeared after the Aparoids' ultimate defeat.

Star Wolf resumed their status as illicit mercenaries in Star Fox Command (2006). As a result, the Cornerian Military placed a bounty for each member, with Wolf having the highest bounty set at $30,000. To avoid attention, Star Wolf set up a base on Fichina before seeking to simultaneously remove their bounties and improve their reputations. Soon after, Wolf recruited Krystal into Star Wolf, following her expulsion from Star Fox over Fox's fear of her losing her life while on the team, like his father James McCloud. Although Command features multiple branching storylines that see Star Wolf having varying degrees of success in their bid to stop the Anglar Empire, Commands director Dylan Cuthbert considered the game as non-canon because of said storylines, rendering it as an alternate timeline-style game.

Star Wolf appears in Star Fox Zero. Due to Zero being a re-imagining of Star Fox 64, Wolf and his team reprise their roles as illicit mercenaries hired by Andross to stop Star Fox by any means necessary. Like Star Fox's Arwing, Star Wolf's Wolfen also became capable of transforming into an all-terrain configuration.

In other media
Wolf's first appearance in the Super Smash Bros. series was a cameo in the opening cutscene of Super Smash Bros. Melee, while his first playable appearance was as an unlockable character in the subsequent title Super Smash Bros. Brawl. Wolf was not part of the playable roster in Super Smash Bros. for Nintendo 3DS and Wii U, but returned in Super Smash Bros. Ultimate. Unlike in Brawl, Wolf no longer has a slightly modified version of his design from Star Fox: Assault and Star Fox Command; instead, it became a combination of his appearance in Star Fox Zero with attire unique to Ultimate. In addition, several of Wolf's moves were updated in regard to both aesthetics and mechanics; most notably, his Final Smash now consists of piloting his Wolfen alongside the rest of Star Wolf before proceeding to bombard the opponent with laser fire, mirroring that of Fox and Falco's versions with the Star Fox team.

The Nintendo Switch version of Starlink: Battle for Atlas features exclusive Star Fox content, including a crossover story that occurs some time after the events of Star Fox Zero. In Starlink, Wolf decides to fly solo in search of additional firepower to use for himself in the power vacuum caused by Andross' defeat. He fled to the Atlas star system to acquire a Spin Drive for his conquest of the Lylat System. Soon after arriving in Atlas, Wolf forged alliances with several Outlaws, most notably Cash Guavo, Zonna Vangore and Koval Grimm. However, Wolf's hideout is eventually discovered by Star Fox and their allies from the Starlink Initiative, and his plot to transport weaponry over to the Lylat System is stopped. After Wolf's initial plan is foiled, he later returns alongside Leon, Pigma and Andrew in order to gain revenge.

Reception
Wolf has received mostly positive reception from critics. He was featured in GamesRadar'''s "The Top 7... Bestest Frenemies" list at seventh place, with the staff saying he "was notable mainly for looking and acting like Fox McCloud would if he were gray and also a bastard". UGO Networks remarked that he was "cool" because he was "a walking, talking fox", but they criticized the fact of three Star Fox being playable characters in Super Smash Bros. Brawl, saying he should be replaced by another franchise character. Sharing the sentiments, Joystick Division ranked him fourth on it article about what Brawl characters should be replaced, with his substitute being Simon Belmont from Castlevania. While agreeing with UGO and Joystick Division, saying Fox "now has TWO clones" (the other being Falco Lombardi), IGN said "[i]t's not really all that bad", remarking how Wolf played "slower and stronger than Fox", differing him to the other series characters in Brawl. WhatCulture said Wolf's obsession to destroy Fox "leads to some of gaming's most exhilarating and challenging dogfights", and ranked him fifty-first on its "100 Greatest Video Game Villains Of All Time" list.

Patrick Lindsey of Paste ranked Wolf O'Donnell as the third best video game wolf in 2014, calling him "ever the Boba Fett to Fox's Han Solo". Jeremy Parish of Polygon ranked 73 fighters from Super Smash Bros. Ultimate "from garbage to glorious", listing Wolf as 54th, criticizing and stated that "Wolf is the Shadow the Hedgehog of the Star Fox universe: An edgier, angrier counterpart to the main character whose greatest legacy is that he's largely been co-opted by the internet fan community to feature in saucy artwork". In 2018, Tyler Treese of GameRevolution praised Wolf's role in Starlink: Battle for Atlas as an antagonist. Gavin Jasper of Den of Geek ranked Wolf as 38th of Super Smash Bros. Ultimate characters in 2019, stating that "Wolf O'Donnell is the evil version of Fox McCloud, which automatically makes him better than Falco because he's able to act on his bad attitude". Like in Brawl, Wolf has enjoyed both popularity and tournament success since returning to the series as a part of Ultimates roster. Some journalists, such as Michael Derosa of Screen Rant, ranked Wolf as one of the best characters to use in Ultimate''.

References

Animal characters in video games
Anthropomorphic wolves
Anthropomorphic video game characters
Extraterrestrial characters in video games
Fictional henchmen in video games
Fictional wolves
Male characters in video games
Male video game villains
Fictional mercenaries in video games
Fictional military personnel in video games
Fictional outlaws
Nintendo antagonists
Nintendo protagonists
Star Fox characters
Super Smash Bros. fighters
Video game bosses
Video game characters introduced in 1997
Video game characters who can move at superhuman speeds
Fictional space pilots
Fictional fighter pilots